Nowick is a surname. Notable people with the surname include:

Arthur Nowick (1923-2010), American materials scientist
James Nowick (born 1964), American professor and chemist
Walter Nowick (1926-2013), American teacher and Zen buddhist

See also
Nowicki